Gispert is a surname. Notable people with the surname include:
 Enric Gispert, choral conductor and director of Ars Musicae de Barcelona
 Luis Gispert (born 1972), American sculptor and photographer
 Núria de Gispert (born 1949), politician and lawyer
 Parker Gispert (born 1982), lead singer of the Whigs
 A. S. Gispert, one of the original members of the Hash House Harriers